Heroldsbach is a municipality in the district of Forchheim in Bavaria in Germany.

References

External links
Schloss Thurn 

Forchheim (district)